Robert Sauzet (December 1927 – 12 February 2023) was a French historian.

Biography
Born in Saint-Hippolyte-du-Fort in December 1927, Sauzet spent his childhood in Saint-Martial. In 1976, he defended his doctoral thesis, titled Contre-Réforme et Réforme catholique en Bas-Languedoc : le diocèse de Nîmes au xviie siècle.

In 2017, he received the Médaille du .

After his marriage to Madeleine Bouillie, he had three sons, including linguist . Robert Sauzet died on 12 February 2023, at the age of 95.

Works
Les Visites pastorales dans le diocèse de Chartres pendant la première moitié du xviie siècle : essai de sociologie religieuse (1975)
Contre-Réforme et Réforme catholique en Bas-Languedoc : le diocèse de Nîmes au xviie siècle (1979)
Les Réformes : enracinement socio-culture (1982)
Pratiques et discours alimentaires à la Renaissance (1982)
Les Frontières religieuses en Europe du xve au xviie siècle (1992)
Henri III et son temps (1992)
Chroniques des frères ennemis : catholiques et protestants à Nîmes du xvie au xviiie siècle (1992)
Les Réguliers mendiants acteurs du changement religieux dans le royaume de France (1480-1560) (1994)
Chrétiens et musulmans à la Renaissance (1998)
Le Notaire et son roi : Étienne Borrelly (1633-1718), un Nîmois sous Louis XIV (1998)
Les Cévennes catholiques : histoire d'une fidélité (xvie-xxe siècles) (2002)
Il governo della città: modelli e pratiche (secoli XIII-XVIII) (2004)
Au Grand Siècle des âmes : guerre sainte et paix chrétienne en France au xviie siècle (2007)
La Ville à la Renaissance : espaces, représentations, pouvoirs (2008)
Religion et société à l'époque moderne : itinéraire de Chartres au val de Loire (2012)

References

1927 births
2023 deaths
20th-century French historians
University of Montpellier alumni
People from Gard